Kenneth Tse 謝德驥 (born 1972) is a Chinese American classical saxophonist.  Tse was mainly self-taught as a youth until he met world-renowned saxophone artist and pedagogue Eugene Rousseau in 1989.  He then studied at the Indiana University School of Music with Rousseau from 1993 to 1998, where he received his BM, MM, and Artist Diploma.  Rousseau has called him "a brilliant saxophonist, worthy of any stage in the world." Tse earned a doctorate degree at the University of Illinois Urbana-Champaign studying under saxophonist Debra Richtmeyer.

Biography
Kenneth Tse started his performance career in 1996 as the winner of the prestigious New York Artists International Award, which resulted in an acclaimed debut recital at Carnegie Hall, after which he was hailed as “a young virtuoso” by the New York Times. The Alex Award from the National Alliance for Excellence led to another Carnegie Hall performance. These are but two of the multitude of awards that Tse has garnered in less than a decade and a half. Since then he has been a frequent soloist on five continents, including solo appearances with the Des Moines Symphony, United States Navy Band, Slovenia Army Band, La Armónica Band of Bunol, Spain, Thailand Philharmonic Orchestra, and Hong Kong Sinfonietta among others. He is frequent featured artist at events such as the triennial World Saxophone Congress and North American Saxophone Alliance conferences. He has also been a guest clinician at conferences hosted by the California Band Directors’ Association, Iowa Bandmaster's Association, and the Midwest International Band and Orchestra Clinics. Prestigious universities and conservatories worldwide, such as Moscow Conservatory and Paris Conservatory have invited him to give master classes.

He has received numerous awards and grants including the prestigious Hong Kong Jockey Club scholarship, New York Music Performance Trust Fund, Indiana University Marcel Mule Scholarship, University of Iowa CD Subvention Fund, Arts and Humanities Initiative Grant, Barlow Commission Fund, as well as an honorary life membership from the Contemporary Record Society.

In 2009, desiring to give back to his home city, Hong Kong, Tse created the first Hong Kong International Saxophone Symposium which attracted over 70 saxophonists from around the world to join the event.  In addition to Tse, Eugene Rousseau from University of Minnesota and Claude Delangle from the Paris Conservatory were the faculty members to 12 active participants from three continents.  With the tremendous success of the premiere event, Tse has formed the Hong Kong International Saxophone Society as part of an effort to facilitate more interest in saxophone performance as well as to continue hosting the symposium every two years to expose Asian saxophonists to world-class saxophone performers and teachers.

Teaching career
Tse is currently the Professor of Saxophone at University of Iowa, President-elect of the North American Saxophone Alliance and the vice president of the International Saxophone Committee. He holds degrees from the University of Illinois Urbana-Champaign (D.M.A.), Indiana University (B.M., M.M. and Artist Diploma) and Hong Kong Academy for Performing Arts. He received the prestigious Artist Diploma from Indiana University School of Music.

Tse's students have garnered high recognition through competitions and recordings as well as concert appearances. During the 2010 North American Saxophone Alliance National Competitions, Tse's students from University of Iowa won three of the top four awards in the conference's classical competitions (in both solo and chamber music categories), the first time for a single studio to do so in the history of the conference.  In the same month, his students also won the top chamber music prize and the second solo prize at the Music Teachers' National Association Competitions. Moreover, to end the academic year, his graduate-student quartet also won the silver medal at the prestigious Fischoff National Chamber Music Competition.

Recordings
"Saxophone Pictures"- Works by David DeBoor Canfield, Erwin Dressel, and Modest Mussorgsky. Crystal Records CD780 2013 
"Chamber Music, Vol. 3"- Works by David DeBoor Canfield. Enharmonic Records 2013 
"Written for Kenneth"- Works by David DeBoor Canfield. Enharmonic Records 2012 
"Martyrs for the Faith"- American Saxophone Concertos, 2012. Works by Paul Creston, David DeBoor Canfield, John Cheetham, and Ingolf Dahl. 
"Stony Brook Soundings Vol. I" (BRIDGE 9318) featuring Kenneth Tse and Escher String Quartet, music by Perry Goldstein
"Stellar Saxes" Duo recording with Nobuya Sugawa 2008, Crystal Records (CD359)
"Adolphe Sax Series Volume IX", 2006, University of Arizona Recordings (AUR CD3122), featuring Dale Underwood and Kenneth Tse
"Pas de Trois", 2006, Crystal Records (CD 358), trio music for saxophone, bassoon, and piano by Feld, Froom, Goldstein, Freund, and van Beurden.
"Seven Settings", 2006, University of Iowa, this is a disc contains works for saxophone by University of Iowa composers
"Lyric Soprano, 2005, Crystal Records (CD 658), music for soprano saxophone only by Naulais, Bedard, Worley, Lewis, including arrangements by Tse of music by Pusculli, Faure, Albeniz, and Piazzolla.
"An American Exhibition", 2002, Crystal Records (CD 657), this disc contains all music by American composers such as Canfield, Cheetham, Larsen, Still, Vosk, Hartley, and Lewis; some of the pieces were written specially for Tse
"In Memory", 2000, Enharmonic Records (ENCD00-014), this is a disc dedicated to his deceased mother, containing music by Bach, Canteloube, Reed, Husa, et al.
"Sonate", 1997, RIAX Records (RICA-2002), music by Maslanka, Saint-Saens, Rueff, and Worley
"Sparkling Sax", 1996, Crystal Records (CD 656), was his debut solo disc containing music by Feld, Muczynski, Heiden, Bernstein, etc.

Musical works written for Tse
Concerto for Alto Saxophone and Band by Frank Ticheli (2013) Consortium member
Con-Tse-to for Alto Saxophone and Concert Band by Gregory Fritze (2013) 
Tengu Maï for Soprano Saxophone and Piano by Robert Lemay (2012) 
Rock Us! for Two Soprano Saxophones by Barry Cockcroft (2012) published by Reed Music
Chaconne for Alto Saxophone Violin and Piano by Athanasios Thomas Peter Aronis (2012)
Cuento #3 for Two Alto Saxophones Piano and Percussion by Nelson Ramirez (2012)
Dualités forAlto Saxophone and Piano by Guy Lacour (2011) Billaudot
Sonata for Tenor Saxophone and Piano by David DeBoor Canfield (2011)
Incandescence for Tenor Saxophone and Piano by Ida Gotkovsky (2011) Consortium member
Paradosis for Soprano Saxophone, Alto Saxophone and Piano by David DeBoor Canfield (2010), written for Stephen Page and Kenneth Tse
Cyrus the Great March for saxophone ensemble by Karl King/arr. Kevin Kastens (2010)
Pictures at an Exhibition for Saxophones and Piano by Modest Mussorgsky/arr. by David DeBoor Canfield (2010)
Reflections, a Waltz for Alto Saxophone and Orchestra by Yuri Sherling (2010)
Blue Arc for Alto Saxophone and Piano by Michael Eckert (2009)
Capriccio for Saxophone Quartet by Leonard Mark Lewis (2009)
Concerto for Alto Saxophone and Band by Leonard Mark Lewis (2009)
Le Tombeau de Ravel for Soprano Saxophone and Piano by Piet Swerts (2009)
Rock Me! for Unaccompanied Saxophone by Barry Cockcroft (2008) published by Reed Music
Sonata for Baritone Saxophone and Piano by David DeBoor Canfield (2008)
Unremembered Wings for Soprano Saxophone and Piano by Andrea Clearfield (2001/2008)
Buffalo Dance for Alto Saxophone and Piano by Luke Dahn (2008)
Duo for Baritone Saxophone and Piano by Walter Hartley (2008)
Fisherman of the Fragrant Harbor for Alto Saxophone and Piano by David DeBoor Canfield (2007)
Quintet for Alto Saxophone and String Quartet by Perry Goldstein (2007)
Sonata for Soprano Saxophone and Piano by David DeBoor Canfield (2006-7)
Arirang Variations for Alto Saxophone, Bassoon, and Piano by David Froom (2005)
Noir for Alto Saxophone, Bassoon, and Piano by Perry Goldstein (2005)
Prelude for Soprano Saxophone and Piano by Leonard Mark Lewis (2004)
Concerto Agrariana for Alto Saxophone and Band by John Cheetham (2004)
On My Mind…for Baritone Saxophone and String Trio by Ketty Nez (2004)
Barum and Bailey's Favorite March and The Melody Shop March for saxophone ensemble by Karl King/arr. Kevin Kastens (2003-4)
Martyrs for the Faith: Concerto for Alto Saxophone and Symphonic Winds by David DeBoor Canfield (2003)
As in Stained Light for Alto Saxophone and Piano by Leonard Mark Lewis (2002)
Le petit duo for Alto Saxophone and Clarinet by David DeBoor Canfield (2001), written for Kenneth and Melanie Tse
Sonata for Alto Saxophone and Piano by John Cheetham (2001)
Sonata for Alto Saxophone and Piano by David DeBoor Canfield (2000)

External links
Kenneth Tse's official website
University of Iowa Saxophone Studio Web page

References

Tse,Kenneth
American classical musicians of Chinese descent
Tse,Kenneth
Tse,Kenneth
American people of Hong Kong descent
Living people
University of Missouri faculty
21st-century American saxophonists
21st-century American male musicians